This article is about the gross regional product (GRP) of German states in main fiscal years. Most figures are from the Federal Statistical Office of Germany; figures from other sources are otherwise referenced. The GRP of German states are shown in Euro (€). For easier comparison as per IMF estimates, all the figures are converted into US$ according to annual average exchange rates.

2021 list

2020 list

2019 list

2018 list

2017 list

2016 list

2015 list

2013 list

2012 list

2011 list

2010 list

2009 list

2008 list

See also 
List of German states by GRP per capita
List of German cities by GDP
 List of German states by area
 List of German states by population
 List of German states by population density
 List of German states by Human Development Index
 List of German states by fertility rate
 List of German states by life expectancy
 List of German states by unemployment rate
 List of German states by household income
 List of German states by exports

References

Notes 
 Federal Statistical Office of Germany
 Annual average exchange rates: GDP (in US$), according to UN Countries GDP list
 Annual exchange rates (as of 31 Dec) from OFX:
 2008: 1 EUR = 1.4714
 2009: 1 EUR = 1.3945
 2010: 1 EUR = 1.3274
 2011: 1 EUR = 1.3927
 2012: 1 EUR = 1.2857
 2013: 1 EUR = 1.3285
 2014: 1 EUR = 1.3292
 2015: 1 EUR = 1.1097
 2016: 1 EUR = 1.1066
 2017: 1 EUR = 1.1301
 2018: 1 EUR = 1.1810
 2019: 1 EUR = 1.1201
 2020: 1 EUR = 1.1422

GRP
GRP
Germany
GRP
Germany, GRP